The 2006 Election Committee subsector elections were held from 7.30 am to 10.30 pm on 10 December 2006 in order to elect 664 members of Election Committee. The Election Committee was responsible for electing the Hong Kong SAR Chief Executive in 2007 Chief Executive Election.

Background
In 2002, Tung Chee-hwa who failed from favour with many Hong Kong people was elected as Chief Executive of Hong Kong in the 2002 poll which the pro-democracy camp boycotted. This time, however, the pro-democracy decided to take part in the Chief Executive election in an attempt to force candidates to care more about the people's livelihood and prevent Donald Tsang reelected uncontested. After discussion, the camp decided that Alan Leong would run as a representative of the camp. As a result, the camp tried hard to gain at least 100 representatives of theirs to get the nomination threshold to enter the race.

Election methods
The General qualifications for candidature are a registered geographical constituency elector; and a registered voter of the concerned subsector or has a substantial connection with that subsector. 5 subscribers are required for nomination of the concerned subsector.

Composition
The 800-member Election Committee was composed of 664 members elected from 35 subsectors; 40 members nominated by the religious subsector; and 96 ex-officio members (Hong Kong deputies to the National People's Congress and Legislative Council members). The 38 subsectors are listed as follows:

 Heung Yee Kuk (21)	
 Agriculture and Fisheries (40)	
 Insurance (12)	
 Transport (12)	
 Education (20)	
 Legal (20)	
 Accountancy (20)	
 Medical (20)	
 Health Services (20)	
 Engineering (20)	
 Architectural, Surveying and Planning (20)	
 Labour (40)	
 Social Welfare (40)	
 Real Estate and Construction (12)	
 Tourism (12)	
 Commercial (First) (12)	
 Commercial (Second) (12)	
 Industrial (First) (12)	
 Industrial (Second) (12)	
 Finance (12)
 Financial Services (12)
 Sports, Performing Arts, Culture and Publication (40)
 Import and Export (12)
 Textiles and Garment (12)
 Wholesale and Retail (12)
 Information Technology (20)
 Higher Education (20)
 Hotel (11)
 Catering (11)
 Chinese Medicine (20)
 Chinese People's Political Consultative Conference (41)
 Employers' Federation of HK (11)
 HK and Kowloon District Councils (21)
 New Territories District Councils (21)
 HK Chinese Enterprises Association (11)
 National People's Congress (36)
 Legislative Council (60)
 Religious (40)

Results
This election is considered as a "decisive victory" by the pro-democracy camp. Out of the 137 candidates, 114 candidates won, together with the 20 ex-officio members of the Legislative Council, there was enough number of nominees required for Alan Leong to be nominated in 2007 election.

Results by subsector
Statistics are generated from the official election website:

Results by political party
The election results are generated from the official election website. The political affiliations are according to the candidate's self-proclaimed affiliations shown on the election platforms, as well as from the Apple Daily and other news. Candidates who are members of political party but did not state in their platforms may not be shown in this table.

|-
! style="background-color:#E9E9E9;text-align:center;" colspan=3 rowspan=2 |Affiliation
! style="background-color:#E9E9E9;text-align:center;" colspan=2 |1st Sector
! style="background-color:#E9E9E9;text-align:center;" colspan=2 |2nd Sector
! style="background-color:#E9E9E9;text-align:center;" colspan=2 |3rd Sector
! style="background-color:#E9E9E9;text-align:center;" colspan=2 |4th Sector
! style="background-color:#E9E9E9;text-align:center;" colspan=2 |Total
|-
! style="background-color:#E9E9E9;text-align:right;" |Standing
! style="background-color:#E9E9E9;text-align:right;" |Elected
! style="background-color:#E9E9E9;text-align:right;" |Standing
! style="background-color:#E9E9E9;text-align:right;" |Elected
! style="background-color:#E9E9E9;text-align:right;" |Standing
! style="background-color:#E9E9E9;text-align:right;" |Elected
! style="background-color:#E9E9E9;text-align:right;" |Standing
! style="background-color:#E9E9E9;text-align:right;" |Elected
! style="background-color:#E9E9E9;text-align:right;" |Standing
! style="background-color:#E9E9E9;text-align:right;" |Elected
|-
|style="background-color:Pink" rowspan="8" |
| width=1px style="background-color: " |
| style="text-align:left;" |Democratic Alliance for the Betterment and Progress of Hong Kong
|18
|17
|2
|0
|7
|7
|16
|16
|43
|40
|-
| width=1px style="background-color: " |
| style="text-align:left;" |Liberal Party
|14
|13
|8
|5
|colspan=2|–
|4
|3
|26
|21
|-
|style="background-color: "|
| style="text-align:left;" | Hong Kong Federation of Trade Unions
|colspan=2|–
|colspan=2|–
|12
|12
|colspan=2|–
|12
|12
|-
|style="background-color: "|
| style="text-align:left;" | Federation of Hong Kong and Kowloon Labour Unions
|colspan=2|–
|colspan=2|–
|4
|4
|colspan=2|–
|4
|4
|-
| width=1px style="background-color: " |
| style="text-align:left;" |Education Convergence
|colspan=2|–
|5
|3
|colspan=2|–
|colspan=2|–
|5
|3
|-
| width=1px style="background-color: " |
| style="text-align:left;" |Civil Force
|colspan=2|–
|colspan=2|–
|colspan=2|–
|2
|2
|2
|2
|-
| width=1px style="background-color: " |
| style="text-align:left;" |New Century Forum
|1
|1
|colspan=2|–
|colspan=2|–
|colspan=2|–
|1
|1
|-
| width=1px style="background-color: " |
| style="text-align:left;" |Estimated pro-Beijing individuals and others
|217
|169
|299
|104
|164
|106
|86
|83
|766
|462
|- style="background-color:Pink"
| colspan=3 style="text-align:left;" | Total for pro-Beijing camp || 250	|| 200 || 314 || 112 || 187 || 129 || 108	|| 104 || 859 || 545
|-
|style="background-color:PaleGreen" rowspan="14" |
| width=1px style="background-color: " |
| style="text-align:left;" |Civic Party
|3
|0
|15
|15
|5
|4
|2
|0
|25
|19
|-
| width=1px style="background-color: " |
| style="text-align:left;" |Democratic Party
|colspan=2|–
|9
|9
|7
|6
|25
|0
|41
|15
|-
| width=1px style="background-color: " |
| style="text-align:left;" |Hong Kong Social Workers' General Union
|colspan=2|–
|colspan=2|–
|21
|10
|colspan=2|–
|21
|10
|-
| width=1px style="background-color: " |
| style="text-align:left;" |Demo-Social 12
|colspan=2|–
|colspan=2|–
|11
|9
|colspan=2|–
|11
|9
|-
| width=1px style="background-color: " |
| style="text-align:left;" |Hong Kong Professional Teachers' Union
|colspan=2|–
|8
|8
|colspan=2|–
|colspan=2|–
|8
|8
|-
| width=1px style="background-color: " |
| style="text-align:left;" |Academics In Support of Democracy
|colspan=2|–
|6
|6
|colspan=2|–
|colspan=2|–
|6
|6
|-
| width=1px style="background-color: " |
| style="text-align:left;" |Engineers for Universal Suffrage
|colspan=2|–
|6
|6
|colspan=2|–
|colspan=2|–
|6
|6
|-
| width=1px style="background-color: " |
| style="text-align:left;" |IT Voice
|colspan=2|–
|6
|6
|colspan=2|–
|colspan=2|–
|6
|6
|-
| width=1px style="background-color: " |
| style="text-align:left;" |Democratic Accountants
|colspan=2|–
|5
|5
|colspan=2|–
|colspan=2|–
|5
|5
|-
| width=1px style="background-color: " |
| style="text-align:left;" |Hong Kong Caritas Employees Union
|colspan=2|–
|colspan=2|–
|2
|1
|colspan=2|–
|2
|1
|-
| width=1px style="background-color: " |
| style="text-align:left;" |Hong Kong Association for Democracy and People's Livelihood
|colspan=2|–
|colspan=2|–
|1
|1
|colspan=2|–
|1
|1
|-
| width=1px style="background-color: " |
| style="text-align:left;" |Hong Kong Democratic Development Network
|colspan=2|–
|1
|1
|colspan=2|–
|colspan=2|–
|1
|1
|-
| width=1px style="background-color: " |
| style="text-align:left;" |Hong Kong Democratic Foundation
|colspan=2|–
|1
|1
|colspan=2|–
|colspan=2|–
|1
|1
|-
| width=1px style="background-color: " |
| style="text-align:left;" |Pro-democratic individuals and others
|2
|0
|28
|26
|colspan=2|–
|colspan=2|–
|30
|26
|- style="background-color:PaleGreen"
| colspan=3 style="text-align:left;" | Total for pro-democracy camp || 5 || 0 || 85 || 83 || 47 || 31	|| 27 || 0 || 164 || 114
|-
| width=1px style="background-color: " rowspan=2 |
| width=1px style="background-color: " |
| style="text-align:left;" |Hong Kong Public Doctors' Association
|colspan=2|–
|13
|5
|colspan=2|–
|colspan=2|–
|13
|5
|-
| width=1px style="background-color: " |
| style="text-align:left;" |Hong Kong Chinese Medicine Practitioners' Rights General Union
|colspan=2|–
|10
|0
|colspan=2|–
|colspan=2|–
|10
|0
|-
|style="text-align:left;background-color:#E9E9E9" colspan="3"|Total (turnout 27.43%)
|style="text-align:right;background-color:#E9E9E9"|255
|style="text-align:right;background-color:#E9E9E9"|200
|style="text-align:right;background-color:#E9E9E9"|422
|style="text-align:right;background-color:#E9E9E9"|200	
|style="text-align:right;background-color:#E9E9E9"|234	
|style="text-align:right;background-color:#E9E9E9"|160	
|style="text-align:right;background-color:#E9E9E9"|135	
|style="text-align:right;background-color:#E9E9E9"|104	
|style="text-align:right;background-color:#E9E9E9"|1,046	
|style="text-align:right;background-color:#E9E9E9"|664	
|}

See also
 2007 Hong Kong Chief Executive election
 Politics of Hong Kong

References 

E
E
2006 elections in China
E
December 2006 events in China